Julyan Holmes is a Cornish scholar and poet. Born in 1948, Holmes has worked on such topics as Cornish placenames, the Prophecy of Merlin of John of Cornwall, and the writings of the Penwith School.

He is a member of Gorseth Kernow under the Bardic name of Blew Melen ('Yellow Hair').

Bibliography
1973: An Lef Kernewek. Redruth
1983: Julyan Holmes, 1000 Cornish Place Names Explained. Redruth: Dyllansow Truran 
1988: Joannes Cornubiensis (Yowann Kernow/John of Cornwall); Julyan Holmes, trans. An dhargan a Verdhin / The prophecy of Merlin; treylyes dhe Gernewek ha dhe Sowsnek a'n Latin a'n 12ves kansblyden gans / translated into Cornish and into English from the 12th century Latin . Gwinear: Kesva an Taves Kernewek / The Cornish Language Board  (full parallel English/Cornish text)
1989: Julyan Holmes, 1000 Cornish Place Names Explained. Hyperion 
2001: Joannes Cornubiensis; Julyan Holmes, trans. An dhargan a Verdhin / The prophecy of Merlin, 2nd ed. Gwinear: Kesva an Taves Kernewek / The Cornish Language Board

References

1948 births
Living people
Bards of Gorsedh Kernow
Cornish language
Cornish-language writers
Poets from Cornwall